Colby Pridham (born August 7, 1987) is a Canadian professional ice hockey player.

Pridham played five seasons (2008 – 2013) of Canadian college hockey in the Atlantic University Sport (AUS) conference of Canadian Interuniversity Sport (CIS). Pridham's outstanding play was recognized when he was named to the 2012-13 AUS First All-Star Team.

On March 28, 2013, the Fort Worth Brahmas of the CHL signed Pridham to an amateur try-out agreement, and he played three games with the Brahmas during the 2012–13 CHL playoffs.

Awards and honours

References

External links

1987 births
Living people
Canadian ice hockey left wingers
Fort Worth Brahmas players
Halifax Mooseheads players